The Holyoke Canal System is a system of power canals in Holyoke, Massachusetts. It is split into three canals based on elevation and distance from the inlet at the Holyoke Dam- the First Level Canal, Second Level Canal, and Third Level Canal. Constructed over a period between 1847 and 1892, the Canal System, along with the Dam, is recognized as a Historic Mechanical Engineering Landmark by the American Society of Mechanical Engineers for its use in the development of the Venturi meter by Clemens Herschel, the first means of measuring large-scale flows, and the McCormick-Holyoke Turbine by John B. McCormick, which doubled the efficiency of turbines to more than 80% in its time.

History 

The earliest predecessor to Holyoke's canals dates to 1827, when the Hadley Falls Company was established to manufacture cotton cloth. Its water-powered looms were fed from a wing dam along the Connecticut River's Great Rapids.

That year the company was reconstituted, with a capital stock of $4,000,000, to create a new manufacturing center based on local river power. Over the next 10 years it would build the area's dam and canal system, lay out industrial, commercial, and residential areas on its  of land, and construct and operate two cotton mills and a factory making textile machinery.

The early canals were dug by men with picks and shovels, together with horse-drawn teams. Canal construction continued on and off until 1892.

He formed the Holyoke Water Power Company and sold stock to investors. Over the next 30 years the company flourished, as a number of large mills were built in the area. Energy was transmitted from the waterwheels to mills via a distribution system of gears, shafts, pulleys, and belts. The canals first produced municipal electricity on October 14, 1884, from an electric generator connected to a water wheel–driven shafting in an industrial building. In 1888 this was replaced by a combination hydro and steam electric power plant on the First Level Canal.

Today the canal system is owned by the City of Holyoke and operated by its municipal Gas and Electric Department which bought out the assets of Holyoke Water Power in December 2001. As early as 1995, plans were proposed to create a "canal walk" as part of a "necklace park plan." Styled after the Emerald Necklace, this proposal called for linking Olmsted-designed parks to the Canal District, parks already along the canal, and the historical downtown. By 2015, the Massachusetts Department of Transportation completed a new phase of sidewalk construction alongside the canals, opening the Canal Walk that linked the downtown to the then-new Holyoke station. The canals are drained twice every year, in the spring and fall, to allow for maintenance.

Description 

The canals are now used for electrical power generation as the water descends level by level to the river.

It extends eastward about a thousand feet and then sweeps south for more than one mile (1.6 km) to supply the upper tier of mills.

It begins at its south end, and runs north for over a mile.

The Third Level Canal begins at the south end of the Second Level, but some  lower, and extends .

Bridges

Throughout the three canals there are 28 bridges carrying cars, pedestrians, and parts of the former Holyoke & Westfield Railroad, today operated by the Pioneer Valley Railroad. Of these, in total 21 remain operable. Five single lane bridges, all on the Third Canal, are closed, with one similar remaining in operation at Gatehouse Road. The oldest bridge in the system is the stone deck arch bridge, built in 1894, at the intersections of Cabot and Canal Street. Five rail bridges remain operable, including three trusses, along with one defunct deck bridge and another converted into a pedestrian bridge for the Canal Walk. At least two pedestrian bridges, one by Hadley Thread Mill and another by Holyoke Die Cut Card remain closed; another one pedestrian bridge at the corner of Oliver St was demolished in the latter half of the 20th century.

Gallery

See also

 South Hadley Canal
 National Register of Historic Places listings in Hampden County, Massachusetts

References

Further reading

External links 

 Holyoke Canalwalk Project Overview | Friends of the Canalwalk

Geography of Holyoke, Massachusetts
Buildings and structures in Holyoke, Massachusetts
Canals on the National Register of Historic Places in Massachusetts
Canals in Massachusetts
Bodies of water of Hampden County, Massachusetts
National Register of Historic Places in Hampden County, Massachusetts
Hydroelectric power plants in Massachusetts
Transportation buildings and structures in Hampden County, Massachusetts
Historic Mechanical Engineering Landmarks